Coleophora tristella is a moth of the family Coleophoridae. It is found in Asia Minor, including Turkey.

References

tristella
Moths of Asia
Moths described in 1879